Sir Richard Wynn, 4th Baronet (1625–1674) was Sheriff of Caernarvonshire and twice a member of Parliament for the same county.

Biography
Sir Richard succeeded his father Sir Owen Wynn at Gwydir in 1660. His mother was Grace Williams, a niece of the Archbishop of York. 

Sir Richard was sheriff of Caernarvonshire (1657/1658) and twice MP for Caernarvonshire: in the Rump Parliament 1647–1653 and the Cavalier Parliament (1661–1675).

Sir Richard spent some time imprisoned in Caernarvon Castle. He may have been incarcerated because of possible involvement in the Royalist Booth's Uprising (1659) as he was by that time a son-in-law to one of the participants Sir Thomas Myddelton.

Sir Richard died in 1674 and was succeeded to the title by his cousin Sir John Wynn, 5th Baronet, the only son of Henry Wynn (the tenth son of the 1st baronet).

Family
In 1654 Sir Richard married Sarah, daughter of Sir Thomas Myddelton.  They had one child, Mary (1661–1689) who inherited the Gwydir estate on the death of her father. She married Robert Bertie (1660–1723), 17th Lord Willoughby de Eresby and later 1st Duke of Ancaster and Kesteven.

Notes

References

 . Endnotes:
 Cal. Wynn (of Gwydir) Papers, passim; 
 Clenennau Letters, i, Introduction
 Hist. Gwydir Family, passim
  W. R. Williams, Parl. Hist. of Wales, passim
 E. Breeze, Kalendars of Gwynedd, passim; Cymm., xxxviii
  The Welsh Review, v, 187–191; Trans. Caern. Hist. Soc., 1939, 37–46; J. E. Griffith, Pedigrees, 280–1

Further reading

 — unpublished M.A. thesis

1625 births
1674 deaths
Baronets in the Baronetage of England
House of Cunedda
Members of the Parliament of England (pre-1707) for constituencies in Wales
High Sheriffs of Caernarvonshire
English MPs 1661–1679